Ana Rita Gomes Machado (born 17 August 1991 in Lisbon) is a Portuguese television actress. In 2001 when she appeared as "Pipa" in the soap opera Ganância (Greed). In 2002, she appeared in TVI's  Sonhos Traídos.

References

External links
 

1991 births
Living people
Portuguese television actresses
Actresses from Lisbon
21st-century Portuguese actresses